On 5 March 2021, a suicide car bombing occurred outside Luul Yemeni restaurant in Mogadishu, Somalia. The attack killed at least 20 people and injured another 30. Later the same day, jihadist group al-Shabaab claimed responsibility for the attack.

References

2021 murders in Somalia
2020s building bombings
March 2021 bombing
21st-century mass murder in Somalia
March 2021 bombing
Attacks on buildings and structures in 2021
March 2021 bombing 
Attacks on restaurants in Africa
Building bombings in Somalia
Car and truck bombings in Somalia
Car and truck bombings in the 2020s
Islamic terrorist incidents in 2021
March 2021 crimes in Africa
Mass murder in 2021
March 2021 bombing
Suicide bombings in 2021
March 2021
Suicide car and truck bombings in Somalia
Terrorist incidents in Somalia in 2021